John Patrick Vivian Flynn (born 14 March 1983) is a British actor and singer-songwriter. He has starred as Dylan Witter in the Channel 4 and Netflix television sitcom Lovesick, and portrayed David Bowie in the film Stardust.

Flynn is the lead singer and songwriter of the band Johnny Flynn & The Sussex Wit. He has released five studio albums, and soundtracks and live albums.

Early life and education 
Flynn was born on 14 March 1983 in Johannesburg, South Africa, the son of Eric Flynn, a British actor and singer, and Caroline Forbes. From his father's first marriage he has two older half-brothers, actors Jerome Flynn and Daniel Flynn, and an older half-sister, Kerry Flynn, and from his father's second marriage, a younger sister, Lillie Flynn, who sings with the Sussex Wit. At the age of two, he moved with his family to the UK.

Flynn won a music scholarship to Pilgrims School, an independent school in the city of Winchester in Hampshire, where he sang in the chapel choir and was required, because of his scholarship, to learn two instruments: the violin and trumpet. Later, he taught himself guitar and won a second music scholarship to Bedales School, an independent school in the village of Steep, near the market town of Petersfield, also in Hampshire, before moving on to Webber Douglas Academy of Dramatic Art to study acting.

Flynn has scars on his face from an attack by a Staffordshire Bull Terrier when he was a child in South Africa.

Career

Film and television 
In 2005, Flynn was one of Screen International's Stars of Tomorrow.

Flynn had parts in the television series Murder in Suburbia, Holby City and Kingdom. He rose to fame in his starring role of Dolf Vega in the film Crusade in Jeans (2006).

In 2011, Flynn's music was used in the film A Bag of Hammers. In 2013, Flynn was cast in Song One, a film starring Anne Hathaway. Flynn plays a musician by the name of James Forester, who becomes involved with Hathaway's character, following an accident involving her brother.

In 2014, Flynn played the lead role of Dylan in the rom-com television series Scrotal Recall which aired on Channel 4. After finding success on Netflix, the streaming network went on to commission a second series of 8 episodes, without Channel 4's involvement, which was made available globally on the streaming network in November 2016 under the new name Lovesick. The show's third series arrived on Netflix on 1 January 2018.

In 2015, he was one of the stars of the Comedy Central sitcom Brotherhood. In it, he played one of two adult brothers who have to raise their younger brother when their mother unexpectedly dies. It was billed as the British version of the US sitcom Two and a Half Men.

In 2017, he played the younger Albert Einstein in National Geographic's show Genius.
Also in 2017, he played Pascal Renouf, a secretive outsider suspected of a series of brutal murders in director/writer Michael Pearce's debut dark thriller Beast, which premiered at the Toronto International Film Festival and was released in the UK on 27 April 2018.

In 2018, Flynn played William Dobbin in the ITV and Amazon Studios television serial adaptation of Vanity Fair. He also played Felix Tholomyès in the BBC miniseries adaptation of Les Misérables.

In 2019, he starred as David Bowie in the drama Stardust, based on a screenplay by Christopher Bell and directed by Gabriel Range.

In 2020, he starred in Emma, Autumn de Wilde's adaptation of Jane Austen's novel of the same name, alongside Anya Taylor-Joy, Bill Nighy, and Josh O'Connor. He wrote the song played over the ending credits, "Queen Bee," which was released as a single alongside the film. The next year, he co-starred in another British film The Dig, which was released on Netflix on 29 January 2021. He plays the character of Rory Lomax. 

In 2022, he had a major role in The Outfit, alongside Mark Rylance.

His upcoming projects include a heist musical starring Will Poulter and Naomi Ackie, titled The Score. He has also been cast as Dickie Greenleaf for Showtime's new TV series of Ripley, to star Andrew Scott. The film Operation Mincemeat, in which Flynn played author Ian Fleming, was released in 2021.

Stage 
Flynn performed in Propeller's all-male Shakespeare troupe, playing Curtis (The Taming of the Shrew) and Viola (Twelfth Night) in the 2007 season. He has also performed in several other plays including Richard Bean's play The Heretic at the Royal Court Theatre (2011). Johnny Flynn was cast in the role of Lee in Jerusalem, Jez Butterworth's hit play, for which he was nominated for an Olivier Award for best supporting actor. In summer of 2012, Flynn appeared in Shakespeare's Globe Theatre's productions of Richard III, as Lady Anne, opposite Jerusalem co-star Mark Rylance and then as Viola/Cesario in the Globe's production of Twelfth Night with Rylance as well. The productions transferred to the Apollo Theatre in the West End until February 2013. In March 2013 Flynn played the lead role in Bruce Norris' play The Low Road at the Royal Court. In September 2015 he played Mooney alongside David Morrissey and Reece Shearsmith also at the Royal Court in Martin McDonagh's new play Hangmen.

Awards and nominations 
Flynn was longlisted in the Evening Standard Awards and the What's On Stage Awards for best Newcomer for his role in The Heretic in 2012. He was nominated for an Olivier Award for his role in Jerusalem the same year. He won a commendation in the 2012 Ian Charleson Awards for his role as Viola in Twelfth Night at the Globe Theatre.

Music 

Flynn has released several studio albums featuring folk revival songs of his own composition. He released his debut, A Larum, in 2008, and received critical acclaim. His second album Been Listening featured a duet with fellow British folk musician Laura Marling on the track "The Water". This was followed by Country Mile in 2013 and Sillion in 2017. Aside from Been Listening, each of Flynn's albums has charted in the top 100 in the UK. In May 2021, Flynn released Lost in the Cedar Wood, a collaboration with nature writer Robert Macfarlane. The album was influenced by the ancient Mesopotamian poem the Epic of Gilgamesh.

Flynn has also written musical scores for films, television shows, and theatre productions. This includes writing the film score for the 2012 film A Bag of Hammers, and the score and theme song of the BBC Four television series Detectorists, which he performed in a cameo appearance in series one, episode 3. In 2015, he also composed the music (on period instruments) for the Globe Theatre's production of As You Like It.

Flynn's version of "Rambleaway" appeared on Shirley Inspired..., a 2015 tribute album to British folk singer Shirley Collins.

He co-wrote the song Coins for Eyes with Robert Macfarlane for the 9th series of the BBC archaeology programme Digging for Britain.

Personal life 
Johnny married theatre designer Beatrice Minns in 2011, whom he had dated on-and-off since secondary school. They have three children together and live in east London.

Discography

Singles and EPs 
 Sweet William EP (2009)
 Home & Dry (For the Fishing Industry Safety Group) (2021)
 Coins for the Eyes  (2022)
 Six Signs: Six Songs  (2022)

Soundtracks 
 A Bag of Hammers (2011)
 Detectorists (2014)
 Song One (2014)
 Emma (2020)
 The Score (2021)

Albums 
 A Larum (2008)
 Been Listening (2010)
 Country Mile (2013)
 Live in Washington DC (2014)
 Sillion (2017)
Live at the Roundhouse  (2018)
Lost in the Cedar Wood  (2021)

Filmography

Film

Television

References

External links 
 

1983 births
Living people
British indie rock musicians
English folk musicians
English male film actors
English male television actors
Male actors from Johannesburg
People educated at Bedales School
South African folk musicians
South African male film actors
South African male television actors
South African people of English descent
Theatre World Award winners
Transgressive Records artists
White South African people